Daniel Yun is a Singaporean veteran film producer. He joined Singapore Broadcasting Corporation Radio as vice-president of Radio Sales in 1991 and became head of Programming in 1992. He was the head of Marketing Communications, and Programming and Acquisition departments for Television Corporation of Singapore (TCS) in 1994.

In 1998, Yun became the vice-president of Production 5 at TCS. In the same year, he became the CEO of Mediacorp Raintree Pictures.

In 2015, Yun co-produced, co-wrote and co-directed 1965 (2015). In 2016, Daniel founded Blue3 Asia with the YDM Global Company.

Filmography

Raintree Pictures
 The Truth About Jane and Sam (1999)
 I Not Stupid (2002)
 The Eye (2002)
 Turn Left, Turn Right (2003)
 Infernal Affairs II (2003)
 The Maid (2005)
 881 (2007) 
 The Tattooist (2007)
 The Home Song Stories (2007)
 Protégé (2007)
 One Last Dance
 Painted Skin (2008)

Homerun Asia
 Homecoming
 My Dog Dou Dou
 Aftershock (2010)
 Under The Hawthorne Tree (2010)
 The Lady (2011)

Blue3 Pictures
 1965 (2015)

References

External links
 Daniel Yun interview
 Daniel Yun's blog
 

Singaporean film producers
Chinese film producers
Hong Kong film producers
Hong Kong film presenters
Mediacorp
Singaporean people of Chinese descent
Victoria School, Singapore alumni
Living people
Year of birth missing (living people)